Ronald Daniel Karnaugh (born July 19, 1966) is an American former competition swimmer who represented the United States at the 1992 Summer Olympics.  Karnaugh competed in the men's 200-meter individual medley, advanced to the event final, and finished sixth overall in a time of 2:02.18.

See also
 List of University of California, Berkeley alumni
 List of World Aquatics Championships medalists in swimming (men)

References

1966 births
Living people
American male medley swimmers
California Golden Bears men's swimmers
Medalists at the FINA World Swimming Championships (25 m)
Olympic swimmers of the United States
People from Irvington, New Jersey
Swimmers at the 1991 Pan American Games
Swimmers at the 1992 Summer Olympics
World Aquatics Championships medalists in swimming
Pan American Games gold medalists for the United States
Pan American Games medalists in swimming
Goodwill Games medalists in swimming
Competitors at the 1998 Goodwill Games
Medalists at the 1991 Pan American Games
20th-century American people